Harold Wells (born November 26, 1938) is a former American football linebacker in the National Football League who played for the Philadelphia Eagles. He played college football for the Purdue Boilermakers. While playing at defensive end for Purdue, he was selected by the Associated Press as a first-team player on the 1964 All-America football team.

References

1938 births
Living people
American football linebackers
Philadelphia Eagles players
Purdue Boilermakers football players